Legislative elections to elect members of the Imperial Council were held in Cisleithania, the Austrian section of Austria-Hungary over several days in June and July 1911.
A coalition of German national and liberal parties, the Deutscher Nationalverband, emerged as the largest bloc in Parliament, holding 100 of the 516 seats. Voter turnout was 80.2%.

This was the second election under universal male suffrage, and the last before the dissolution of the empire as a result of World War I. At that dissolution it was the German representatives that formed the first truly Austrian legislative body of the Republic of German-Austria.

In the German-speaking areas the results however were similar to the previous elections in 1907, with the Christian Socials as the largest party (76 seats), followed by the Social Democrats (43) and the German People's Party (32). Both the major parties lost seats, and the parties which gained were the moderate centre and the radicals. Results varied by province, with Lower Austria providing the political base for the two largest parties. There was a wide difference between rural areas (Christian Social) and urban (Social Democrat), a split (social cleavage) that had become more evident since 1907, with the Christian Socials losing their support in the outer belt of Viennese districts. Support for the German People's Party was more even. The German People's Party found its support in the middle strata of Austrian society. On the other hand, industrialists rejected this party in favour of the Freisinnige group, particularly the German Progressive Party, as did the more prosperous merchants.

Among the non-German nationalities, the results also differed widely between nations.

Results

By parliamentary grouping

See also 
List of political parties in Austria
1911 Cisleithanian legislative election in the Czech lands
1911 Cisleithanian legislative election in the Kingdom of Dalmatia

References

Bibliography 
 MANGHAM, ARTHUR NEAL. THE SOCIAL BASES OF AUSTRIAN POLITICS: THE GERMAN ELECTORAL DISTRICTS OF CISLEITHANIA, 1900-1914. Ph.D. thesis 1974

1911 elections in Europe
1911
1911 in Austria-Hungary
June 1911 events